Salvatore Avallone (born 30 August 1969, in Salerno) is a retired Italian footballer who played as a midfielder.

Honours
Juventus
 UEFA Europa League winner: 1989–90.
 Coppa Italia winner: 1989–90.

External links

1969 births
Living people
Italian footballers
Serie A players
Serie B players
Juventus F.C. players
U.S. Avellino 1912 players
Casale F.B.C. players
U.S. Alessandria Calcio 1912 players
S.S.D. Varese Calcio players
A.S.G. Nocerina players
S.S. Juve Stabia players
UEFA Cup winning players
Association football midfielders